Royal Consort Sug-ui of the Miryang Park clan (Hangul: 숙의 박씨; Hanja: 淑儀 朴氏; ? – 30 June 1854) was a concubine of King Sunjo of Joseon and the mother of Princess Yeongon.

Lady Sug-ui was born into the Miryang Park clan. She died on June 30, 1854 (the 5th year of King Cheoljong's reign).

In popular culture
 Portrayed by Jeon Mi-seon in the 2016 KBS2 TV series Love in the Moonlight.

References

Joseon dynasty
Royal consorts of the Joseon dynasty
Year of birth unknown
1854 deaths
18th-century Korean women
18th-century Korean people